A total solar eclipse occurred on September 10, 1923.

A solar eclipse occurs when the Moon passes between Earth and the Sun, thereby totally or partly obscuring the image of the Sun for a viewer on Earth. A total solar eclipse occurs when the Moon's apparent diameter is larger than the Sun's, blocking all direct sunlight, turning day into darkness. Totality occurs in a narrow path across Earth's surface, with the partial solar eclipse visible over a surrounding region thousands of kilometres wide.

The path of totality started at the southeastern tip of Shiashkotan in Japan (now in Russia) on September 11, and crossed the Pacific Ocean, southwestern California including the whole Channel Islands, northwestern and northern Mexico, Yucatan Peninsula, British Honduras (today's Belize), Swan Islands, Honduras, and Serranilla Bank and Bajo Nuevo in Colombia on September 10. The eclipse was over 90% in Los Angeles, San Diego and Santa Barbara in the Southern California coast.

Related eclipses

Solar eclipses of 1921–1924

Solar 143

Notes

References

 Foto and sketchs of Solar Corona September 10, 1923

1923 09 10
1923 in science
1923 09 10
September 1923 events